Orcuttia tenuis, the slender Orcutt grass, is a species of grass which is endemic to northern California.

Description
It grows in vernal pool habitat in the western and northern foothills surrounding the Sacramento Valley.

Orcuttia tenuis is a federally listed threatened species.

External links
Jepson Manual Treatment - 'Orcuttia tenuis''
Orcuttia tenuis - Photo gallery

tenuis
Endemic flora of California
Native grasses of California
Bunchgrasses of North America
Natural history of the California Coast Ranges
Plants described in 1934
Threatened flora of California